Jean Willybiro-Sako (born May 11, 1946) is a politician in the Central African Republic. He was the Minister of State for Higher Education and Scientific Research from April 2011 to January 2013.

External links
 willybirosako2015.com 

1946 births
Living people
Government ministers of the Central African Republic
Place of birth missing (living people)